HTN can refer to:

Medicine 
 Hypertension

Transport 
 Hammonton station, New Jersey, United States
 Hathiyan railway station, Pakistan
 Hatton railway station, Sri Lanka
 Hatton (Warwickshire) railway station, England
 Hotan Airport, Xinjiang, China
 Houten railway station, Netherlands

Computing
 Hierarchical task network, planning formalism in artificial intelligence
 "Homesteading the Noosphere",  essay on computer programming

Organisations
 Home Theater Network, defunct movie subscription service
 Houghton Mifflin, now part of Houghton Mifflin Harcourt
 Hughes Television Network, defunct American television network